Solitalea canadensis is a bacterium from the genus of Solitalea which has been isolated from soil in Canada.

References

External links
Type strain of Solitalea canadensis at BacDive -  the Bacterial Diversity Metadatabase	

Sphingobacteriia
Bacteria described in 1980